The Andong Kim clan (Hangul: 안동 김씨, Hanja: 安東 金氏) refers to two Korean clans. They were prominent yangban families during Korea's Joseon Dynasty originating from Andong, North Gyeongsang province, during the Goryeo Dynasty. The clans produced many individuals who passed the gwageo, and 3 Queen Consorts during the Joseon Dynasty, Queen Sunwon, Queen Hyohyeon, and Queen Cheorin. Both clans derive from the Gyeongju Kim clan, and in 2015, the census counted a total of 519,719 members from both clans.

Type

Andong Kim clan (Old)
The Old Andong Kim clan (구 안동 김씨, 舊 安東 金氏) was founded during the Goryeo Dynasty by Kim Bang-gyeong (김방경, 金方慶; 1212 —1300) who later made his ascendant, Kim Suk-seung (김숙승, 金叔承), the grandson of Gyeongsun of Silla, or Kim Il-geung (김일긍, 金日兢), the progenitor of the clan. The clan was also known as the Sangrak Kim clan (상락 김씨, 上洛 金氏).

When the Mongols invaded during the reign of King Gojong of the Goryeo Dynasty, Kim Bang-gyeong entered Wido in 1248 as a Byeongma Pangwan in Seobuk-myeon. He was listed as a member of the Central Book of Records, and in 1283 he was killed as a Crown Prince of the Threefold Grand Gwang, Cheomui Jungchan, and Panjeonri Sasa. Thus the king had Kim establish a clan. The census in 2015 found the number of members to be 425,264.

Andong Kim clan (New)
Kim Seub-don (김습돈, 金習敦) made his ascendant, Kim Seon-pyeong (김선평, 金宣平), the founder of New Andong Kim clan (신 안동 김씨, 新 安東 金氏). Kim Seon-pyeong was one of the founding contributors of the Goryeo Dynasty. He was originally a castellan of Andong province. Later, he received a new surname from Taejo of Goryeo thanks to his contribution to the founding of the new dynasty. In 2015, the number of members of the New Andong Kim clan amounted to 47,702 individuals.

Downfall
Heungseon Daewongun removed much of the Andong Kim clan's power during the 19th century. During the Gabo Reform, the Yangban class was abolished.

Prominent individuals from the Old Andong Kim clan 
 Kim Suk-seung (grandson of Gyeongsun of Silla)
Royal Noble Consort Myeong (Taejong of Joseon’s concubine)
Crown Princess Hwi (Munjong of Joseon’s first wife)
 Kim Si-min (general during Joseon Dynasty)
 Kim Ja-jeom (scholar and politician during Joseon Dynasty)
 Kim Gu (politician and independence activist during the 20th century)
Kim Jil (scholar and politician during early Joseon Dynasty)

Prominent individuals from the New Andong Kim clan 
Kim Jo-sun, Korean political figure during the late Joseon period
Queen Sunwon, Queen Consort and wife of Sunjo of Joseon
Kim Jwa-geun, Korean political figure during the late Joseon period
Queen Hyohyeon, Queen Consort and wife of King Heonjong of Joseon
Queen Cheorin, Queen Consort and wife of King Cheoljong
Kim Ok-gyun, reformist activist during the late Joseon period
Kim Chwa-chin, Korean general and independence activist
Kim Du-han, South Korean mobster, politician and anti-communist activist
Kim Eul-dong, South Korean politician and former actress